Bruno Felipe Lima Teixeira (born 18 September 1992), commonly known as Bruno Lima, is Brazilian footballer who plays for XV de Piracicaba as a defensive midfielder.

Career
Born in São Paulo, Bruninho began his career on Portuguesa and made his debut on 19 May 2012, coming on as a late substitute for Wilson Tiago in a 1–1 away draw against Palmeiras for the Série A championship. He was handed his first start on 1 September, in a 0–2 away loss against Vasco.

On 12 April 2014 Bruninho signed a four-year deal with Palmeiras, after rescinding with Lusa. On 1 February 2015, after being rarely used, he was loaned to Santa Cruz.

Honours

Portuguesa
 Série B: 2011
 Paulistão Série A2: 2013

References

External links

1992 births
Living people
Brazilian footballers
Association football midfielders
Campeonato Brasileiro Série A players
Campeonato Brasileiro Série B players
Associação Portuguesa de Desportos players
Sociedade Esportiva Palmeiras players
Santa Cruz Futebol Clube players
Mogi Mirim Esporte Clube players
Esporte Clube Juventude players
Esporte Clube XV de Novembro (Piracicaba) players
Footballers from São Paulo